Buona Vista Single Member Constituency was a constituency in Singapore. It used to exist from 1976 to 1997 and it was merged into Tanjong Pagar GRC.

Member of Parliament

Elections

Elections in 1970s

Elections in 1980s

Elections in 1990s

References 

Singaporean electoral divisions
Queenstown, Singapore
Constituencies established in 1976
Constituencies disestablished in 1997
1976 establishments in Singapore
1997 disestablishments in Singapore